The Next Falkland Islands general election will elect all eight members of the Legislative Assembly (five from the Stanley constituency and three from the Camp constituency) through universal suffrage using block voting, with the Chief Executive of the Falkland Islands acting as returning officer. It will be the fifth election since the new Constitution came into force replacing the Legislative Council (which had existed since 1845) with the Legislative Assembly.

Timing and procedure
Under the Constitution of the Falkland Islands, the Legislative Assembly must be dissolved by the Governor four years after the first meeting of the Legislative Assembly following the last election (unless the Executive Council advises the Governor to dissolve the Legislative Assembly sooner). An election must then take place within 70 days of the dissolution.

With the first meeting of the current Legislative Assembly taking place on 8 November 2021, the Legislative Assembly must be dissolved by midnight on 7 November 2025 and an election must take place before 17 January 2026. However, if recent precedent is followed, the Executive Council is likely to ask the Governor for an early dissolution and an election to take place sometime in November 2025 (four years after the last election). Following the British convention, elections normally take place on a Thursday.

Incumbent members

References

Next
Future elections in South America
Future elections in British Overseas Territories